Aleksandr Yuryevich Shlyonkin (born 12 October 2000) is a Russian football player who plays for FC Tekstilshchik Ivanovo.

Club career
He made his debut in the Russian Football National League for FC Tekstilshchik Ivanovo on 1 August 2020 in a game against FC Veles Moscow, as a starter.

References

External links
 
 Profile by Russian Football National League
 

2000 births
Sportspeople from Ivanovo
Living people
Russian footballers
Association football forwards
FC Tekstilshchik Ivanovo players